The 2006–07 Moldovan "B" Division was the 16th season of Moldovan football's third-tier league. There are 23 teams in the competition, in two groups, 11 in the North and 12 in the South.

"B" Division North

Final standings

"B" Division South

Final standings

External links 
 Official Site (North)
 Official Site (South)
 "B" Division - moldova.sports.md

Moldovan Liga 2 seasons
3
Moldova